Burch, or more commonly known locally as Burch Station, is an  unincorporated community along the Yadkin River in the Marsh Township of Surry County, North Carolina, United States.  The community sits on the mouth of the Mitchell River where it empties into the Yadkin.  The community is known as Burch Station after the former train depot there on the former Southern Railway, now used by the Yadkin Valley Railroad.

Maps of Burch and Surrounding Area

Unincorporated communities in Surry County, North Carolina
Unincorporated communities in North Carolina